9th New York Film Critics Circle Awards
January ?, 1944(announced December 28, 1943)

Going My Way
The 9th New York Film Critics Circle Awards, announced on 28 December 1943, honored the best filmmaking of 1943.

Winners
Best Film:
Watch on the Rhine
Best Actor:
Paul Lukas - Watch on the Rhine
Best Actress:
Ida Lupino - The Hard Way
Best Director:
George Stevens - The More the Merrier
Special Awards:
Report from the Aleutians
Why We Fight

References

External links
1943 Awards

1943
New York Film Critics Circle Awards, 1943
1943 in American cinema
1943 in New York City